Sarepta is a town in Webster Parish, Louisiana, United States. The population was 891 at the 2010 census. It is part of the Minden Micropolitan Statistical Area.

Sarepta was named for the town's first church's benefactor, Sarepta Carter. Local history tells that Mrs. Carter donated a Bible to the community church on the premise that it be named for her. Years later the church split, and the original name became Old Sarepta. The new congregation became New Sarepta.

Geography
Sarepta is located at  (32.897373, -93.449382).

According to the United States Census Bureau, the town has a total area of 1.6 square miles (4.2 km2), all land.

Demographics

2020 census

As of the 2020 United States census, there were 717 people, 332 households, and 247 families residing in the town.

2000 census
As of the census of 2000, there were 925 people, 369 households, and 271 families residing in the town. The racial makeup of the town was 96.65% White, 2.05% African American, 0.11% Native American, 0.86% from other races, and 0.32% from two or more races. Hispanic or Latino of any race were 1.62% of the population.

There were 369 households, out of which 36.3% had children under the age of 18 living with them, 62.1% were married couples living together, 8.4% had a female householder with no husband present, and 26.3% were non-families. 24.7% of all households were made up of individuals, and 13.0% had someone living alone who was 65 years of age or older. The average household size was 2.51 and the average family size was 2.98.

In the town, the population was spread out, with 25.3% under the age of 18, 7.9% from 18 to 24, 28.1% from 25 to 44, 20.8% from 45 to 64, and 17.9% who were 65 years of age or older. The median age was 37 years. For every 100 females, there were 89.9 males. For every 100 females age 18 and over, there were 89.3 males.

The median income for a household in the town was $32,917, and the median income for a family was $39,083. Males had a median income of $31,776 versus $21,250 for females. The per capita income for the town was $14,945. About 5.7% of families and 9.9% of the population were below the poverty line, including 8.4% of those under age 18 and 13.4% of those age 65 or over.

Education
Sarepta has a 6th-8th grade school, North Webster Jr. High School, located at 6041 Hwy 2. The school's mascot is the Charger.  The colors are purple, silver, and black.  Formerly Sarepta High School, North Webster Jr. High School was formed during consolidation in 2011.  The school serves as the junior high school for the entire north end of Webster Parish.  Students that previously attended Sarepta School in grades K-5 and 9-12 now attend school at various other facilities in north Webster Parish.

Notable people

 Trace Adkins, country music singer and actor

References

Towns in Webster Parish, Louisiana
Populated places in Webster Parish, Louisiana